Professional services automation (PSA) is software designed to assist professionals, such as lawyers, auditors, and IT consultants, with project management and resource management for client projects and utilization rate management for billable staff. This is accomplished by developing metrics to quantify and qualify basic business processes that can then be used to streamline and improve those processes.

Typical PSA functions include project management and documentation, time recording, billing, reporting, and resource utilization. These features are often integrated with accounting, Customer Relationship Management (CRM) systems, and payroll systems in order to improve efficiency of overall operations. As a result, in addition to better managing client projects, independent contractors can prevent lost revenue and slow billing cycles.

Ultimately PSA software suites allow users to integrate industry-appropriate metrics in order to better understand operations and, in turn, improve efficiency and profitability. As businesses grow, the size and complexity of their projects tend to increase as well. PSA software is used to provide visibility into mid-project profitability.

Software types
In its simplest form, PSA software may offer only timesheet systems (including expense reporting and project management). However, in their most robust incarnation they can also include customer relationship management (CRM), resource management, opportunity and knowledge management.

Benefits 
PSA software is designed to improve the performance and profitability of professional services firms. A recent end-user survey conducted by SPI Research showed significant improvement in key performance indicators such as:
 Faster staffing and invoicing workflows
 Lower project cancellation rates
 Improved on-time, under-budget project delivery rates
 Lower revenue leakage 
 Higher resource utilization rates
 Improved project margins

The study concluded with a return on investment (ROI) model for an average 172-person professional services firm. According to the research, over a five-year horizon, the firm could expect to invest just under $200,000 in implementation and software license costs. The return, however, was estimated at nearly $23 million in increased revenue and reduced costs.

Software awards

As in most software categories, the Software and Information Industry Association rates this category of software.

References

Further reading 

Business software
Services marketing
Professionalism